Noah is a 2010 Philippine adventure fantasy drama television series directed by Malu L. Sevilla and Lino S. Cayetano. The series stars Piolo Pascual and Zaijian Jaranilla in the title role, with an ensemble cast consisting of Jodi Sta. Maria, Jolo Revilla, Melissa Ricks, Xyriel Manabat, Kristine Hermosa, Cherry Pie Picache, Tessie Tomas, Joem Bascon, Baron Geisler, Ana Capri, Lou Veloso, and Nonie Buencamino among others in their supporting roles. The series premiered on ABS-CBN's Primetime Bida nighttime block, replacing Kung Tayo'y Magkakalayo on its timeslot from July 12, 2010, to February 4, 2011, and was replaced by Mutya.

This series is currently streaming on Jeepney TV YouTube Channel every 7:00 pm & 7:30 pm.

Series overview

Synopsis
Gabriel (Piolo Pascual) lost his 2-year-old son, Jacob (Zaijian Jaranilla) in an accident brought by his job as a police officer. It also placed him in a coma for 5 years. Upon awakening, He went back to service and started searching for his son, whom he knew in his gut was still alive.

Jacob drifted to a mysterious Island of Noah, where a group of old looking apes called Unta dwell. They took care of Jacob and renamed him Eli. There Gabriel searches for his son and comes across him but now his son finds him part of the Unta tribe. He was unable to convince Eli that he is in fact his son, Gabriel joins him in his quest and bonds them together. But little did Gabriel knew that his son's quest is actually his own and that what ever will be the outcome of this quest will determine the fate of the outside world.

Plot
As a kid, he wanted to be a policeman to put his own father in jail not just for the crimes he's committed, but also for hurting his mother. For good things happen to those with pure intentions, he meets Ruth (Jodi Sta. Maria)—a beautiful lady who will later on give him a son. They marry each other even without the blessings of Ruth's mother. But sometimes, fate has a way of playing with people's lives. One of the criminals Gabriel busted years ago manages to escape the prison. To have his revenge, the criminal goes after that which matters most to Gabriel-his family. Now, Gabriel finds himself fighting for his life and that of his wife and son. After five years of suffering from amnesia, Gabriel recalls everything but it's too late. His wife is already married to his former suitor. He realizes that she does not intend to return to him. How ironic that he's regained his memory only to find out that he's already lost everything he cares for. And so he decides to look for his son. He strongly believes that he is still alive. And he is right. For his son now lives with the Ungtas in the island of Noah—a world completely different and unknown to men.

But Ruth is also just pretending that she's forgotten the tragedy that took her son away and changed their lives. She still holds grunge for Gabriel for allowing his job to put their family in danger. Meanwhile, Eli welcomes his 7th birthday with disappointment as he wakes up without a tail. He has anticipated it since he was younger. With such sadness on Eli's eyes, Adah can't find the strength to tell him the truth for she knows it will bring the child more pain. But Eli finds something in the forest that might give him an explanation on he really is — a toy soldier. He trains day and night to regain his strength. Not long after that, Gabriel finds himself in a police station again... as a police officer. This way, it will be easier for him to find his son Jacob. Meanwhile, Eli continues to seek the creatures that look like him. He asks around trying to gather information and follows the colorful bird that flies in and out of Noah hoping to get a lead. Eli fails to reach the riverbank leading to the sea where he believes he can find others that look like him. So he, together with his best friend Lotlot, escapes on that night to follow the bird. He has no idea about the danger that's about to come his way for his Uncle Caleb releases the buwa-buwas to sabotage his brother's reign.

At the near end of this, Gabriel shoots Judah, although before Judah dies, he shoots Gabriel and Gabriel slowly dies. Before he dies, he puts all of Isla Noah and the world back to normal. After, Gabriel dies, although, the Diwata lets him go back to life and Gabriel and Ruth are happily married.

Cast and characters

Main cast

Piolo Pascual as Gabriel Perez – A tough and good policeman who is the father of Jacob Perez/Eli. Because of his intense love for his son, Gabriel went on an unending quest to find him and bring him back.
Zaijian Jaranilla as Jacob Perez / Eli – Son of Gabriel Perez, he is one of the ungtas (tribe of monkey-like humanoids). When he was two years old, an accident separated him from his parents and landed him on the island of Noah. He must prove himself to them, but this begins to be difficult as Gabriel and other humans invade Noah.

Supporting cast
Jodi Sta. Maria as Ruth De Leon-Perez – Eli/Jacob's mother. She left Gabriel two years after the accident. She couldn't bear the pain that he husband has caused her and to continue on and not loose much of her life. She began a new life with Judah. She and Jacob experienced mistreatment and resentment from Judah.
Kristine Hermosa as Diwatang Eva – The forest deity of Noah. She tries to help Eli and Gabriel in their journey, but in doing so, could fulfill a prophesy that is dangerous for her.
Jolo Revilla as Levi Aragon – Gabriel's police partner, son of one of the most decorated police officers in the country. He wants to do his family proud that is why when he was assigned to Gabriel he took every opportunity to learn from him. But when he sets his sights to Naomi, that is when problem occurs. 
Xyriel Manabat as Veronica "Nica" Avila
Melissa Ricks as Naomi Mondragon – Judah's sister, she takes care of their zoo business and falls for Levi, but she has a mean streak about her which Levi love.
Cherry Pie Picache as Rebecca De Leon – The mother of Ruth and a social climber. She will do anything to get rich, even trying to wed her daughter to someone with money. For her having money will solve all her problems in life, and she will have it no matter what.
Tessie Tomas as Sarah Perez – Gabriel's mother and Jacob's grandmother. She never gives up for his son, a trait she taught Gabriel.
Joem Bascon as Judah Mondragon – Ruth's husband and Joshua's father. He took care of her after the accident she met with her then live in partner, Gabriel. He is a wealthy businessman and a ruthless hunter. He has secrets that if revealed will shatter the foundation of her relationship with Ruth. He actually mistreats Jacob and Ruth, and subsequently Rebecca.
Baron Geisler as Caleb – Gideon's brother who wants only one thing to be the tribe's leader. Gideon is selfish as he is arrogant, he will stop at nothing to gain power, but in truth he does not have the skills to handle all the power he wants.
Ana Capri as Adah – Gideon's wife and mother to Eli, she and Gideon did not have a child of their own, that is why when Eli came to them, they regarded him as on of their own, raining him and loving him as if he came from them.
Nonie Buencamino as Gideon – leader of the Ungtas, father of Eli. He is the greatest leader the tribe has ever known, everybody respects him and Eli looks up to him so much, but his world will clash as Gabriel goes to Noah in search for his own son.
Renzo Cruz as Goliath – Caleb's second in command, he is more greedy than his master. A monster waiting to be unleashed.
Lou Veloso as Tatang Zatok – the Imam of the tribe. He is the most knowledgeable about the island.

Recurring cast 
Ina Feleo as Tessa Avila - Nica's mother who distrusts Jacob for her daughter.
Miguelito De Guzman as Joshua Mondragon - Judah's son and Jacob's stepbrother.
Daniel Fernando as Arturo "Toro" Mamaril
Frank G. Rivera as Supt. Cayatano
Jon Achaval as Supt. San Jose
Francis Magundayao as Teen Gabriel Perez

Guest cast
Eric Fructuoso as Jose Isaac Perez
Smokey Manaloto as Badong Belmonte
Neil Ryan Sese as Ramon
Spanky Manikan as Ernie
Tony Manalo as Supt. Salvador
Cathy Remperas as Diwata
Mariel Sorino as Diwata
Yuri Okawa as Diwata
Carol Batay as Diwata
John Paul Santos as Extra Unta
Emily Loren as Inang Ria

Production and reception
The series was announced in January 25, 2010, during the time when May Bukas Pa (where Zaijian Jaranilla currently portrays upon the series' announcement) is still in production, launched as part of the half-term show line-up by ABS-CBN as part of the 60th Anniversary of Philippine Soap Opera, and presented as the network's station ID for the rainy season in the Philippines. The show's trailer was released and its website was launched in June 2010. Production and principal photography of the series was done from July 12, 2010 to February 4, 2011.

Due to weather problems caused by the typhoon Basyang, the first week episodes of the series was replayed as a marathon on July 17, 2010.

See also
List of ABS-CBN drama series
List of programs broadcast by ABS-CBN

References

External links 
 

ABS-CBN drama series
Television series by Dreamscape Entertainment Television
2010 Philippine television series debuts
2011 Philippine television series endings
Police procedural television series
Law enforcement in fiction
Philippine action television series
Filipino-language television shows
Television shows set in the Philippines
Philippine adventure television series
Television series about animals